The Nintendo Entertainment System (NES) is an 8-bit third-generation home video game console produced by Nintendo. It was first released in Japan in 1983 as the  commonly known as the  The NES, a redesigned version, was released in American test markets on October 18, 1985, before becoming widely available in North America and other countries.

After developing a series of successful arcade games in the early 1980s, Nintendo planned to create a home video game console. Rejecting more complex proposals, the Nintendo president Hiroshi Yamauchi called for a simple, cheap console that ran games stored on cartridges. The controller design was reused from Nintendo's portable Game & Watch games. Nintendo released several add-ons, such as a light gun for shooting games.

The NES was one of the best-selling consoles of its time and helped revitalize the US gaming industry following the video game crash of 1983. It introduced a now-standard business model of licensing third-party developers to produce and distribute games. The NES featured a number of groundbreaking games, such as the 1985 platform game Super Mario Bros. and the 1986 action-adventure games The Legend of Zelda and Metroid, which became long-running franchises. It was succeeded in 1990 by the Super Nintendo Entertainment System. In 2011, IGN named the NES the greatest video game console of all time.

History

Development 

Following a series of arcade game successes in the early 1980s, Nintendo made plans to create a cartridge-based console called the Family Computer, or Famicom. Masayuki Uemura designed the system. The console's hardware was largely based on arcade video games, particularly the hardware for Namco's Galaxian (1979) and Nintendo's Radar Scope (1980) and Donkey Kong (1981), with the goal of matching their powerful sprite and scrolling capabilities in a home system. Original plans called for an advanced 16-bit system which would function as a full-fledged computer with a keyboard and floppy disk drive, but Nintendo president Hiroshi Yamauchi rejected this and instead decided to go for a cheaper, more conventional cartridge-based game console as he believed that features such as keyboards and disks were intimidating to non-technophiles. A test model was constructed in October 1982 to verify the functionality of the hardware, after which work began on programming tools. Because 65xx CPUs had not been manufactured or sold in Japan up to that time, no cross-development software was available and it had to be produced from scratch. Early Famicom games were written on a system that ran on an NEC PC-8001 computer and LEDs on a grid were used with a digitizer to design graphics as no software design tools for this purpose existed at that time.

The code name for the project was "GameCom", but Masayuki Uemura's wife proposed the name "Famicom", arguing that "In Japan, 'pasokon' is used to mean a personal computer, but it is neither a home nor personal computer. Perhaps we could say it is a family computer." Meanwhile, Hiroshi Yamauchi decided that the console should use a red and white theme after seeing a billboard for DX Antenna (a Japanese antenna manufacturer) which used those colors.

The Famicom was also influenced by the ColecoVision, Coleco's competition against the Atari 2600 in the United States; the ColecoVision's top-seller was a port of Nintendo's Donkey Kong. The project's chief manager Takao Sawano brought a ColecoVision home to his family, impressed by its smooth graphics, which contrasts with the flicker and slowdown commonly seen on Atari 2600 games. Uemura said the ColecoVision set the bar for the Famicom. They wanted to surpass it and match the more powerful Donkey Kong arcade hardware; they took a Donkey Kong arcade cabinet to chip manufacturer Ricoh for analysis, which led to Ricoh producing the Picture Processing Unit (PPU) chip for the NES.

Original plans called for the Famicom's cartridges to be the size of a cassette tape, but ultimately they ended up being twice as big. Careful design attention was paid to the cartridge connectors because loose and faulty connections often plagued arcade machines. As it necessitated 60 connection lines for the memory and expansion, Nintendo decided to produce its own connectors.

The controllers are hard-wired to the console with no connectors for cost reasons. The controller designs were reused from the Game & Watch machines, although the Famicom design team originally wanted to use arcade-style joysticks, even dismantling some from American game consoles to see how they worked. There were concerns regarding the durability of the joystick design and that children might step on joysticks on the floor. Katsuya Nakawaka attached a Game & Watch D-pad to the Famicom prototype and found that it was easy to use and caused no discomfort. Ultimately though, they installed a 15-pin expansion port on the front of the console so that an optional arcade-style joystick could be used.

Gunpei Yokoi suggested an eject lever to the cartridge slot which is not necessary, but he believed that children could be entertained by pressing it. Uemura adopted his idea. Uemura added a microphone to the second controller with the idea that it could be used to make players voices sound through the TV speaker.

Japanese release 
The Famicom was slow to gather success; a bad chip set caused the early revisions to crash. Following a product recall and a reissue with a new motherboard, the Famicom's popularity soared, becoming the best-selling game console in Japan by the end of 1984.

Nintendo launched the system with only first-party games, but after being approached by Namco and Hudson Soft in 1984, agreed to produce third-party games for a 30% fee for console licensing and production costs. This rate continued in the industry for consoles and digital storefronts through the 21st Century.

North American release 

Nintendo also had its sights set on the North American market, entering into negotiations with Atari, Inc. to release the Famicom under Atari's name as the Nintendo Advanced Video Gaming System. The deal was set to be finalized and signed at the Summer Consumer Electronics Show in June 1983. However, Atari discovered at that show that its competitor Coleco was illegally demonstrating its Coleco Adam computer with Nintendo's Donkey Kong game. This violation of Atari's exclusive license with Nintendo to publish the game for its own computer systems delayed the implementation of Nintendo's game console marketing contract with Atari. Atari's CEO Ray Kassar was fired the next month, so the deal went nowhere, and Nintendo decided to market its system on its own.

Subsequent plans for the Nintendo Advanced Video System likewise never materialized: a North American repackaged Famicom console featuring a keyboard, cassette data recorder, wireless joystick controller and a special BASIC cartridge. By the beginning of 1985, more than 2.5 million Famicom units had been sold in Japan, and Nintendo soon announced plans to release it in North America as the Advanced Video Entertainment System (AVS) that year. The American video game press was skeptical that the console could have any success in the region, as the industry was still recovering from the video game crash of 1983. The March 1985 issue of Electronic Games magazine stated that "the videogame market in America has virtually disappeared" and that "this could be a miscalculation on Nintendo's part".

The Famicom hardware first made its North American debut in the arcades, in the form of the Nintendo VS. System in 1984; the system's success in arcades paved the way for the official release of the NES console. With US retailers refusing to stock game consoles, Yamauchi realized there was still a market for video games in the arcades, so he decided to introduce the Famicom to North America through the arcade industry. The VS. System became a major success in North American arcades, becoming the highest-grossing arcade machine of 1985 in the United States. By the time the NES launched, nearly 100,000 VS. Systems had been sold to American arcades. The success of the VS. System gave Nintendo the confidence to release the Famicom in North America as a video game console, for which there was growing interest due to Nintendo's positive reputation in the arcades. It also gave Nintendo the opportunity to test new games as VS. Paks in the arcades, to determine which games to release for the NES launch.

At June 1985's Consumer Electronics Show (CES), Nintendo unveiled the American version of its Famicom, with a new case redesigned by Lance Barr and featuring a "zero insertion force" cartridge slot. The change from a top-loader in the Famicom to a front-loader was to make the new console more like a video cassette recorder, which had grown in popularity by 1985, and differentiate the unit from past video game consoles. Additionally, Uemura explained that Nintendo developers had feared that the console's electronics might face electrostatic hazards in dry American states such as Arizona and Texas, and a front-loading design would be safer if children handled the console carelessly.

This was deployed as the Nintendo Entertainment System (NES). Nintendo seeded these first systems to limited American test markets starting in New York City on October 18, 1985, and followed up in Los Angeles in February 1986; the American nationwide release came on September 27, 1986. Nintendo released 17 launch games: 10-Yard Fight, Baseball, Clu Clu Land, Duck Hunt, Excitebike, Golf, Gyromite, Hogan's Alley, Ice Climber, Kung Fu, Pinball, Soccer, Stack-Up, Super Mario Bros., Tennis, Wild Gunman, and Wrecking Crew.
For expedient production, some varieties of these launch games contain Famicom chips with an adapter inside the cartridge so they play on North American consoles, which is why the title screens of Gyromite and Stack-Up show the titles of the Famicom games Robot Gyro and Robot Block, respectively.

The system's launch represented not only a new product, but also a reframing of the severely damaged home video game market in North America. The 1983 video game crash had occurred in large part due to a lack of consumer and retailer confidence in video games, which had been partially due to confusion and misrepresentation in video game marketing. Prior to the NES, the packaging of many video games presented bombastic artwork which did not represent a game's actual graphics. Furthermore, a single game such as Pac-Man appeared across consoles with substantial variations in graphics, sound, and general quality. In contrast, Nintendo's marketing strategy aimed to regain consumer and retailer confidence by delivering a singular platform whose graphics could be represented truthfully and whose qualities were clearly defined.

To differentiate Nintendo's new home platform from the perception of a troubled and shallow video game market still reeling from the 1983 crash, the company freshened its product nomenclature and established a strict product approval and licensing policy. The overall platform is referred to as "Entertainment System" instead of a "video game system", is centered upon a machine called a "Control Deck" instead of a "console", and features software cartridges called "Game Paks" instead of "video games". This allowed Nintendo to gain more traction in selling the system in toy stores. To deter production of games which had not been licensed by Nintendo, and to prevent copying, the 10NES lockout chip system act as a lock-and-key coupling of each Game Pak and Control Deck. The packaging of the launch lineup of NES games bear pictures of close representations of actual onscreen graphics. To reduce consumer confusion, symbols on the games' packaging clearly indicate the genre of the game. A seal of quality is on all licensed game and accessory packaging. The initial seal states, "This seal is your assurance that Nintendo has approved and guaranteed the quality of this product". This text was later changed to "Official Nintendo Seal of Quality".

Unlike with the Famicom, Nintendo of America marketed the console primarily to children, instituting a strict policy of censoring profanity, sexual, religious, or political content. The most famous example is Lucasfilm's attempts to port the comedy-horror game Maniac Mansion to the NES, which Nintendo insisted be considerably watered down.

The optional Robotic Operating Buddy, or R.O.B., was part of a marketing plan to portray the NES's technology as being novel and sophisticated when compared to previous game consoles, and to portray its position as being within reach of the better established toy market. Though at first, the American public exhibited limited excitement for the console itself, peripherals such as the light gun and R.O.B. attracted extensive attention.

Other markets 
In Europe and Oceania, the NES was released in two separate marketing regions. The first consisted of mainland Europe (excluding Italy) where distribution was handled by a number of different companies, with Nintendo responsible for manufacturing. The NES saw an early launch in Europe in 1986 although most of the European countries received the console in 1987. The release in Scandinavia was on 1 September 1986, where it was released by Bergsala. In the Netherlands, it was distributed by Bandai BV. In France it was released in October 1987, while in Spain between late 1987 and 1988 through distributor Spaco. Also in 1987, Mattel handled distribution for the second region, consisting of the United Kingdom, Ireland, Italy, Australia and New Zealand. Mattel handled distribution for Nintendo in Canada as well, however it was unrelated to the aforementioned European / Australian releases.

In Brazil, the console was released late in 1993 by Playtronic, even after the SNES. But the Brazilian market had been dominated by unlicensed NES clones — both locally made, and smuggled from Taiwan. One of the most successful local clones was the Phantom System, manufactured by Gradiente, which licensed Nintendo products in the country for the following decade. The sales of officially licensed products were low, due to the cloning, the quite late official launch, and the high prices of Nintendo's licensed products.

Outside of Japan, regions in greater Asia received an "Asian Version" of the front-loader NES despite the prevalence of imported Famicom systems. Due to import restrictions, NES consoles in India and South Korea were rebranded and distributed by local licensees. The Indian version is called the Samurai Electronic TV Game System and the Korean version is called the Hyundai Comboy. The console sold very poorly in India.

Later redesigns and bundles 

For its complete North American release, the Nintendo Entertainment System was progressively released over the ensuing years in several different bundles, beginning with the Deluxe Set, the Basic Set, the Action Set and the Power Set.
In 1989, the Power Set included the console, two game controllers, an NES Zapper, a Power Pad, and a triple Game Pak containing Super Mario Bros, Duck Hunt, and World Class Track Meet. In 1990, a Sports Set bundle was released, including the console, an NES Satellite infrared wireless multitap adapter, four game controllers, and a dual Game Pak containing Super Spike V'Ball and Nintendo World Cup. Two more bundle packages were later released using the original model NES console. Instead, it contained a book called the Official Nintendo Player's Guide, which contained detailed information for every NES game made up to that point.

Finally, the console was redesigned for the Australian, North American and Japanese markets. As part of the final Nintendo-released bundle package, the product included the New-Style NES, or NES-101, and one redesigned "dogbone" game controller. In Australia, this version of the system was also available with a cartridge compiling Super Mario Bros, Tetris and Nintendo World Cup.

Discontinuation 
On August 14, 1995, Nintendo discontinued the Nintendo Entertainment System in both North America and Europe.

On May 30, 2003, Nintendo announced the discontinuation of the Famicom in September alongside the Super Famicom and the disk rewriting services for the Famicom Disk System. The last Famicom, serial number HN11033309, was manufactured on September 25; it was kept by Nintendo and subsequently loaned to the organizers of Level X, a video game exhibition held from December 4, 2003, to February 8, 2004, at the Tokyo Metropolitan Museum of Photography, for a Famicom retrospective in commemoration of the console's 20th anniversary. Nintendo offered repair service for the Famicom in Japan until 2007, when it was discontinued due to a shortage of available parts.

Hardware

Configurations 

Although all versions of the Famicom/NES include essentially similar hardware, they vary in physical characteristics. The original Famicom's design is predominantly white plastic, with dark red trim; it featured a top-loading cartridge slot, grooves on both sides of the deck in which the hardwired game controllers could be placed when not in use, and a 15-pin expansion port located on the unit's front panel for accessories. In contrast, the design of the original NES features a more subdued gray, black, and red color scheme; it includes a front-loading cartridge slot covered by a small, hinged door that can be opened to insert or remove a cartridge and closed at other times, and an expansion port on the bottom of the unit. The cartridge connector pinout was changed between the Famicom and NES.

In late 1993, Nintendo introduced a redesigned version of the Famicom/NES (officially named the New Famicom in Japan and the New-Style NES in the U.S.) to complement the Super Famicom/NES and prolong interest in the console while implementing cost reduction measures. For the redesigned NES, Nintendo opted to use a top-loading cartridge slot in to avoid reliability issues with the original console; the redesign also omitted AV output. Conversely, the redesigned Famicom offered such output while introducing detachable game controllers, though the microphone functionality was omitted as a result. The redesigned Famicom and NES models are cosmetically similar aside from the presence of a cartridge "bump" on the NES model, which the Famicom model lacks to accommodate its shorter cartridges as well as the RAM Adapter for the Famicom Disk System.

Sharp Corporation produced three licensed variants of the Famicom in Japan, all of which prominently displayed the shortened moniker rather than the official "Family Computer" name. Another variant was the Twin Famicom, a console released in 1986 that combined a Famicom with a Famicom Disk System. Sharp then produced the Famicom Titler in 1989; intended for video capture and production, it featured internal RGB video generation and video output via S-Video while including inputs for adding subtitles and voice-overs.

Hardware clones 

A thriving market of unlicensed NES hardware clones emerged during the climax of the console's popularity. Initially, such clones were popular in markets where Nintendo issued a legitimate version of the console long time after unlicensed hardware. In particular, the Dendy, an unlicensed hardware clone produced in Taiwan and sold in the former Soviet Union, emerged as the most popular video game console of its time in that setting and it enjoyed a degree of fame roughly equivalent to that experienced by the NES/Famicom in North America and Japan. A range of Famicom clones was marketed in Argentina during the late 1980s and early 1990s under the name of "Family Game", resembling the original hardware design. Thailand got Family FR brand famiclones, the Micro Genius (Simplified Chinese: 小天才) was marketed in Southeast Asia as an alternative to the Famicom; and in Central Europe, especially Poland, the Pegasus was available. Since 1989, there were many Brazilian clones of NES, and the very popular Phantom System (with hardware superior to the original console) caught the attention of Nintendo itself.

The unlicensed clone market has flourished following Nintendo's discontinuation of the NES. Some of the more exotic of these resulting systems surpass the functionality of the original hardware, such as a portable system with a color LCD (PocketFami). Others have been produced for certain specialized markets, such as a rather primitive personal computer with a keyboard and basic word processing software. These unauthorized clones have been helped by the invention of the so-called NES-on-a-chip.

As was the case with unlicensed games, Nintendo has typically gone to the courts to prohibit the manufacture and sale of unlicensed cloned hardware. Many of the clone vendors have included built-in copies of licensed Nintendo software, which constitutes copyright infringement in most countries.

Design flaws 

Nintendo's design styling for US release was made deliberately different from that of other game consoles. Nintendo wanted to distinguish its product from those of competitors and to avoid the generally poor reputation that game consoles had acquired following the video game crash of 1983. One result of this philosophy is to disguise the cartridge slot design as a front-loading zero-insertion force (ZIF) cartridge socket, designed to resemble the front-loading mechanism of a VCR. The socket works well when both the connector and the cartridges are clean and the pins on the connector are new. However, the socket is not truly zero-insertion force. When a user inserts the cartridge into the NES, the force of pressing the cartridge into place bends the contact pins slightly and presses the cartridge's ROM board back into the cartridge. Frequent insertion and removal of cartridges wears out the pins, and the ZIF design proved more prone to interference by dirt and dust than an industry-standard card edge connector.

The design problems were exacerbated by Nintendo's choice of materials. The console slot nickel connector springs wear due to design and the game cartridge's brass plated nickel connectors are also prone to tarnishing and oxidation. Nintendo sought to fix these problems by redesigning the next generation Super Nintendo Entertainment System (SNES) as a top loader similar to the Famicom. Many players try to alleviate issues in the game caused by this corrosion by blowing into the cartridges, then reinserting them, which actually speeds up the tarnishing due to moisture. One way to slow down the tarnishing process and extend the life of the cartridges is to use isopropyl alcohol and swabs, as well as non-conductive metal polish such as Brasso or Sheila Shine.

Users have attempted to solve these problems by blowing air onto the cartridge connectors, inserting the cartridge just far enough to get the ZIF to lower, licking the edge connector, slapping the side of the system after inserting a cartridge, shifting the cartridge from side to side after insertion, pushing the ZIF up and down repeatedly, holding the ZIF down lower than it should have been, and cleaning the connectors with alcohol. Many frequently used methods to fix this problem actually risk damaging gaming cartridges or the system. In 1989, Nintendo released an official NES Cleaning Kit to help users clean malfunctioning cartridges and consoles.

In response to these hardware flaws, "Nintendo Authorized Repair Centers" sprang up across the U.S. According to Nintendo, the authorization program was designed to ensure that the machines were properly repaired. Nintendo would ship the necessary replacement parts only to shops that had enrolled in the authorization program.

With the release of the top-loading NES-101 (New-Style NES) in 1993 toward the end of the NES's lifespan, Nintendo resolved the problems by switching to a standard card edge connector and eliminating the lockout chip. All of the Famicom systems use standard card edge connectors, as do Nintendo's two subsequent game consoles, the Super Nintendo Entertainment System and the Nintendo 64.

Lockout 

The Famicom as released in Japan contains no lockout hardware, which led to unlicensed cartridges (both legitimate and bootleg) becoming extremely common throughout Japan and East Asia. Nintendo tried to promote its "Seal of Quality" in these regions to identify licensed games to combat bootlegs, but bootleg Famicom games continued to be produced even after Nintendo moved production onto the Super Famicom, effectively extending the lifetime of the Famicom.

The original NES released for Western countries in 1985 contains the 10NES lockout chip, which prevents it from running cartridges unapproved by Nintendo. The inclusion of the 10NES was a direct influence from the 1983 video game crash in North America, partially caused by a market flooded with uncontrolled publishing of games of poor quality for the home consoles. Nintendo did not want to see that happen with the NES and used the lockout chip to restrict games to only those they licensed and approved for the system. This means of protection worked in combination with the Nintendo "Seal of Quality", which a developer had to acquire before they would be able to have access to the required 10NES information prior to publication of their game.

Initially, the 10NES chip proved a significant barrier to unlicensed developers seeking to develop and sell games for the console. However, hobbyists in later years discovered that disassembling the NES and cutting the fourth pin of the lockout chip would change the chip's mode of operation from "lock" to "key", removing all effects and greatly improving the console's ability to play legal games, as well as bootlegs and converted imports.

Original NES consoles sold in different regions have different lockout chips, thereby enforcing regional lockout (regardless of TV signal compatibility). Such regions include North America; most of continental Europe (PAL-B); Asia; and the British Isles, Italy, and Australasia (PAL-A).

Problems with the 10NES lockout chip frequently result in one of the console's most common issues: the blinking red power light, in which the system appears to turn itself on and off repeatedly because the 10NES would reset the console once per second. The lockout chip required constant communication with the chip in the game to work. Dirty, aging, and bent connectors often disrupt the communication, resulting in the blink effect. In other cases, the console turns on but only displays a solid white, gray, or green screen.

Technical specifications 

The console's main central processing unit (CPU) was produced by Ricoh, which manufactured different versions between NTSC and PAL regions; NTSC consoles use a 2A03 clocked at 1.79 , while PAL consoles use a 2A07 clocked at 1.66 MHz. Both CPUs are second source variants of the MOS Technology 6502, an 8-bit microprocessor prevalent in contemporary home computers and consoles; Nintendo ostensibly disabled the 6502's binary-coded decimal mode on them to avoid patent infringement against or licensing fees towards MOS Technology, which was owned by then-rival Commodore International. The CPU has access to 2  of onboard work .

The console's graphics are handled by a Ricoh 2C02, a processor known as the Picture Processing Unit (PPU) that is clocked at 5.37 MHz. A derivative of the Texas Instruments TMS9918—a video display controller used in the ColecoVision—the PPU features 2 KB of video RAM, 256 bytes of on-die "object attribute memory" (OAM) to store sprite display information on up to 64 sprites, and 28 bytes of RAM to store information on the YIQ-based color palette; the console can display up to 25 colors simultaneously out of 54 usable colors.

The console's standard display resolution is 256 × 240 pixels, though video output options vary between models. The original Famicom features only radio frequency (RF) modulator output, while the NES additionally includes support for composite video via RCA connectors. The redesigned Famicom omits the RF modulator entirely, only outputting composite video via a proprietary "multi-out" connector first introduced on the Super Famicom/NES; conversely, the redesigned NES features RF modulator output only, though a version of the model including the "multi-out" connector was produced in rare quantities.

The console produces sound via an audio processing unit (APU) integrated into the processor. It supports a total of five sound channels: two pulse wave channels, one triangle wave channel, one white noise channel, and one  channel for sample playback. Audio playback speed is dependent on the CPU clock rate, which is set by a crystal oscillator.

Accessories

Controllers 

The game controller for both the NES and the Famicom has an oblong brick-like design with a simple four button layout: two round buttons labeled "A" and "B", a "START" button, and a "SELECT" button. Additionally, the controllers utilize the cross-shaped D-pad, designed by Nintendo employee Gunpei Yokoi for Nintendo Game & Watch systems, to replace the bulkier joysticks on controllers of earlier gaming consoles.

The original model Famicom features two game controllers, both of which are hardwired to the back of the console. The second controller lacks the START and SELECT button, featuring a small microphone instead; however, few games use this feature. The earliest produced Famicom units have square A and B buttons; issues with them getting stuck when pressed down led Nintendo to change their shape to a circular design in subsequent units following the console's recall.

Instead of the Famicom's hardwired controllers, the NES has two proprietary seven-pin ports on the front of the console to support detachable controllers and third-party peripherals. The controllers bundled with the NES are identical and include the START and SELECT buttons, lacking the microphone on the original Famicom's second controller. The cables for NES controllers are also generally three times longer than their Famicom counterparts.

A number of special controllers are intended for use with specific games, though are not commonly utilized. Such peripherals include the NES Zapper (a light gun), R.O.B. (a toy robot), and the Power Pad (a dance pad). The original Famicom has a deepened DA-15 expansion port on the front of the unit to accommodate them.

Two official advanced controllers were produced for the NES: the NES Advantage, an arcade controller produced by Asciiware and licensed by Nintendo of America; and the NES Max, a controller with grip handles that featured a "cycloid" sliding-disc D-pad in place of the traditional one. Both controllers have a "Turbo" feature, which simulates multiple rapid button presses, for the A and B buttons; the NES Max has manually pressed Turbo buttons, while the NES Advantage offers toggle buttons for Turbo functionality along with knobs that adjust the firing rate of each button. The latter also includes a "Slow" button that rapidly pauses games, though this function is not intended for games that invoke a pause menu or screen.

The standard game controller was redesigned upon the introduction of the redesigned console. Though the original button layout was retained, the shape of the redesigned controller—nicknamed the "dog bone" controller—resembles that of the Super Famicom/NES. In addition, the redesigned Famicom adopted NES-style detachable controller ports.

The original NES controller has become one of the most recognizable symbols of the console. Nintendo has mimicked the look of the controller in several other products, from promotional merchandise to limited edition versions of the Game Boy Advance.

Japanese accessories 

Few of the numerous peripheral devices and software packages for the Famicom were released outside Japan.

The Famicom 3D System, an active shutter 3D headset headset peripheral released in 1987, enabled the ability to play stereoscopic video games. It was a commercial failure and never released outside Japan; users described the headset as bulky and uncomfortable. Seven games are compatible with the glasses, with three of them developed by Square; two titles received worldwide releases as Rad Racer and The 3-D Battles of WorldRunner.

Family BASIC is an implementation of BASIC for the Famicom, packaged with a keyboard. Similar in concept to the Atari 2600 BASIC cartridge, it allows the user to write programs, especially games, which can be saved on an included cassette recorder. Nintendo of America rejected releasing Famicom BASIC in the US in favor of its primary marketing demographic of children.

The Famicom Modem connected a Famicom to a now defunct proprietary network in Japan which provided content such as financial services. A dial-up modem was never released for the NES after a partnership with Fidelity Investments.

Famicom Disk System 

By 1986, the cost and size limitations of ROM chips used in the Famicom's ROM cartridges were apparent, with no new advancements present to address them. With this in mind, Nintendo looked at the personal computer (PC) market, where the floppy disk was gaining wide adoption as a computer data storage medium. Partnering with Mitsumi to develop a floppy disk add-on for the Famicom based on the latter's Quick Disk format, Nintendo officially released it as the Family Computer Disk System in Japan on February 21, 1986, at a retail price of ¥15,000.

The advantages of the format (called "Disk Card") were apparent on launch: it offered more than triple the data storage capacity of the then-largest cartridge (used for Super Mario Bros.) and introduced game save capability while offering lower production costs compared to cartridges, which resulted in lower retail prices for consumers. The add-on also offered upgraded sound capability by adding a wavetable synthesis channel while including more space that developers could use for the Famicom's audio sample channel. Taking advantage of the disk's re-writability, Nintendo set up "Disk Writer" interactive kiosks at retail stores throughout Japan; at each kiosk, consumers could rewrite their disks with new games; new blank disks to write onto were also offered inside it. Nintendo also set up "Disk Fax" kiosks for players to submit their high scores on special blue disks for contests and rankings, predating the online leaderboard by several years.

Although Nintendo committed to exclusively releasing games on the Disk System after its release, numerous external issues plagued its long-term viability. Just four months after launch, Capcom released a Famicom port of Makaimura (known as Ghosts 'n Goblins in the U.S.) on a cartridge with more data storage capacity than what was possible on Disk Cards, nullifying one of the Disk System's major advantages by using discrete logic chips to perform bank switching. Nintendo also demanded half of the copyright ownership for each game it selected for release on the Disk System, resulting in developers electing to remain on cartridge instead as the latter gained functionality previously considered unique to the former. Developers additionally loathed the Disk Writer kiosks due to their lower profit margin, while retailers complained of their presence taking up valuable space as interest in the format waned.

Usage of a floppy disk-based medium brought about further complications; Disk Cards were more fragile than cartridges and were prone to data corruption from magnetic exposure. Their unreliability was exacerbated by their lack of a shutter, which Nintendo substituted with a wax sleeve and clear keep case to reduce costs; blue disks and later Disk Cards included shutters. The rubber belt-based disk drives were also unreliable, with cryptic error codes complicating troubleshooting; even when fully functional, players accustomed to cartridges were annoyed with the introduction of loading times and disk flipping. Furthermore, the rewritable nature of the format resulted in rampant software piracy, with Nintendo's attempts at anti-piracy measures quickly defeated.

Despite selling close to two million units for all of 1986, Nintendo only managed to increase the total to 4.4 million units by 1990, falling well short of internal projections. By then, the Disk System was rendered obsolete due to advancements in ROM cartridge production: memory mapping chips for expanded data storage capacity, battery-backed  for game saving, and declining overall production costs. While Nintendo alluded to a Western release for the Disk System, going so far as to successfully file a U.S. patent for it and having the Famicom's cartridge pins used by its RAM Adapter for enhanced audio rerouted to the NES's little-used bottom expansion port, such a release never materialized due to its reception in Japan. Most of its games were re-released with workarounds on cartridge for both the Famicom and NES, albeit without the enhanced audio. Although the last game for the Disk System was released in December 1992, Nintendo continued to offer repair and rewrite services for it until September 2003.

NES Test Station 

The NES Test Station diagnostics machine was introduced in 1988. It is an NES-based unit designed for testing NES hardware, components, and games. It was only provided for use in World of Nintendo boutiques as part of the Nintendo World Class Service program. Visitors were to bring items to test with the station, and could be assisted by a store technician or employee.

The NES Test Station's front has a Game Pak slot and connectors for testing various components (AC adapter, RF switch, Audio/Video cable, NES Control Deck, accessories and games), with a centrally-located selector knob to choose which component to test. The unit itself weighs approximately 11.7 pounds without a TV. It connects to a television via a combined A/V and RF Switch cable. By actuating the green button, a user can toggle between an A/V Cable or RF Switch connection. The television it is connected to (typically 11" to 14") is meant to be placed atop it.

In 1991, Nintendo provided an add-on called the "Super NES Counter Tester" that tests Super NES components and games. The Super NES Counter Tester is a standard Control Deck on a metal fixture with the connection from the back of the unit re-routed to the front. These connections may be made directly to the test station or to the TV, depending on what is to be tested.

Games

Game Pak 

The NES uses a 72-pin design, as compared with 60 pins on the Famicom. To reduce costs and inventory, some early games released in North America are simply Famicom cartridges attached to an adapter to fit inside the NES hardware. Early NES cartridges are held together with five small slotted screws. Games released after 1987 were redesigned slightly to incorporate two plastic clips molded into the plastic itself, removing the need for the top two screws.

The back of the cartridge bears a label with handling instructions. Production and software revision codes were imprinted as stamps on the back label to correspond with the software version and producer. All licensed NTSC and PAL cartridges are a standard shade of gray plastic, with the exception of The Legend of Zelda and Zelda II: The Adventure of Link, which were manufactured in gold-plastic carts. Unlicensed carts were produced in black, robin egg blue, and gold, and are all slightly different shapes than standard NES cartridges. Nintendo also produced yellow-plastic carts for internal use at Nintendo Service Centers, although these "test carts" were never made available for purchase. All licensed US cartridges were made by Nintendo, Konami, and Acclaim. For promotion of DuckTales: Remastered, Capcom sent 150 limited-edition gold NES cartridges with the original game, featuring the Remastered art as the sticker, to different gaming news agencies. The instruction label on the back includes the opening lyric from the show's theme song, "Life is like a hurricane".

Famicom cartridges are shaped slightly differently. Unlike NES games, official Famicom cartridges were produced in many colors of plastic. Adapters, similar in design to the popular accessory Game Genie, are available that allow Famicom games to be played on an NES. In Japan, several companies manufactured the cartridges for the Famicom. This allowed these companies to develop customized chips designed for specific purposes, such as superior sound and graphics.

Third-party licensing 

Nintendo's near monopoly on the home video game market left it with a dominant influence over the industry. Unlike Atari, which never actively pursued third-party developers (and even went to court in an attempt to force Activision to cease production of Atari 2600 games), Nintendo had anticipated and encouraged the involvement of third-party software developers, though strictly on Nintendo's terms. Some of the Nintendo platform-control measures were adopted in a less stringent way by later console manufacturers such as Sega, Sony, and Microsoft.

To this end, a 10NES authentication chip is in every console and in every licensed cartridge. If the console's chip can not detect a counterpart chip inside the cartridge, the game does not load. Nintendo portrayed these measures as intended to protect the public against poor-quality games, and placed a golden seal of approval on all licensed games released for the system.

Nintendo found success with Japanese arcade manufacturers such as Konami, Capcom, Taito and Namco, which signed on as third-party developers. However, they found resistance with US game developers including Atari Games, Activision, Electronic Arts and Epyx refusing Nintendo's one-sided terms. Acclaim Entertainment, a fledgling game publisher founded by former Activision employees, was the first major third-party licensee in the United States to sign on with Nintendo in late 1987. Atari Games (through Tengen) and Activision signed on soon after.

Nintendo was not as restrictive as Sega, which did not permit third-party publishing until Mediagenic in late summer 1988. Nintendo's intention was to reserve a large part of NES game revenue for itself. Nintendo required that it be the sole manufacturer of all cartridges, and that the publisher had to pay in full before the cartridges for that game be produced. Cartridges could not be returned to Nintendo, so publishers assumed all the risk. As a result, some publishers lost more money due to distress sales of remaining inventory at the end of the NES era than they ever earned in profits from sales of the games. Because Nintendo controlled the production of all cartridges, it was able to enforce strict rules on its third-party developers, who were required to sign a contract that would obligate them to develop exclusively for the system, order at least 10,000 cartridges, and only make five games per year. The global 1988 shortage of DRAM and ROM chips reportedly caused Nintendo to only permit an average of 25% of publishers' requests for cartridges, with some receiving much higher amounts and others almost none. GameSpy noted that Nintendo's "iron-clad terms" made the company many enemies during the 1980s. Some developers tried to circumvent the five game limit by creating additional company brands like Konami's Ultra Games label; others tried circumventing the 10NES chip.

Nintendo was accused of antitrust violations because of the strict licensing requirements. The United States Department of Justice and several states began probing Nintendo's business practices, leading to the involvement of Congress and the Federal Trade Commission (FTC). The FTC conducted an extensive investigation which included interviewing hundreds of retailers. During the FTC probe, Nintendo changed the terms of its publisher licensing agreements to eliminate the two-year rule and other restrictive terms. Nintendo and the FTC settled the case in April 1991, with Nintendo required to send vouchers giving a $5 discount off to a new game, to every person that had purchased an NES game between June 1988 and December 1990. GameSpy remarked that Nintendo's punishment was particularly weak giving the case's findings, although it has been speculated that the FTC did not want to damage the video game industry in the United States.

With the NES near the end of its life, many third-party publishers such as Electronic Arts supported upstart competing consoles with less strict licensing terms such as the Sega Genesis and then the PlayStation, which eroded and then took over Nintendo's dominance in the home console market, respectively. Consoles from Nintendo's rivals in the post-SNES era had always enjoyed much stronger third-party support than Nintendo, which relied more heavily on first-party games.

Unlicensed games 

Companies that refused to pay the licensing fee or were rejected by Nintendo found ways to circumvent the console's authentication system. Most of these companies created circuits that use a voltage spike to temporarily disable the 10NES chip. A few unlicensed games released in Europe and Australia are in the form of a dongle to connect to a licensed game, in order to use the licensed game's 10NES chip for authentication. To combat unlicensed games, Nintendo of America threatened retailers who sold them with losing their supply of licensed games, and multiple revisions were made to the NES PCBs to prevent unlicensed games from working.

Atari Games took a different approach with its line of NES products, Tengen. The company attempted to reverse engineer the lockout chip to develop its own "Rabbit" chip. Tengen also obtained a description of the lockout chip from the United States Patent and Trademark Office by falsely claiming that it was required to defend against present infringement claims. Nintendo successfully sued Tengen for copyright infringement. Tengen's antitrust claims against Nintendo were never decided.

Color Dreams made Christian video games under the subsidiary name Wisdom Tree. Historian Steven Kent wrote, "Wisdom Tree presented Nintendo with a prickly situation. The general public did not seem to pay close attention to the court battle with Atari Games, and industry analysts were impressed with Nintendo's legal acumen; but going after a tiny company that published innocuous religious games was another story."

Game rentals 
As the Nintendo Entertainment System grew in popularity and entered millions of American homes, some small video rental shops began buying their own copies of NES games, and renting them out to customers for around the same price as a video cassette rental for a few days. Nintendo received no profit from the practice beyond the initial cost of their game, and unlike movie rentals, a newly released game could hit store shelves and be available for rent on the same day. Nintendo took steps to stop game rentals, but did not take any formal legal action until Blockbuster Video began to make game rentals a large-scale service. Nintendo claimed that allowing customers to rent games would significantly hurt sales and drive up the cost of games. Nintendo lost the lawsuit, but did win on a claim of copyright infringement. Blockbuster was banned from including photocopies of original, copyrighted instruction booklets with its rented games. In compliance with the ruling, Blockbuster produced original short instructions—usually in the form of a small booklet, card, or label stuck on the back of the rental box—that explained the game's basic premise and controls. Video rental shops continued the practice of renting video games.

Reception 
By 1988, industry observers stated that the NES's popularity had grown so quickly that the market for Nintendo cartridges was larger than that for all home computer software. Compute! reported in 1989 that Nintendo had sold seven million NES systems in 1988 alone, almost as many as the number of Commodore 64s sold in its first five years. "Computer game makers [are] scared stiff", the magazine said, stating that Nintendo's popularity caused most competitors to have poor sales during the previous Christmas and resulted in serious financial problems for some.

In June 1989, Nintendo of America's vice president of marketing Peter Main, said that the Famicom was present in 37% of Japan's households. By 1990, 30% of American households owned the NES, compared to 23% for all personal computers. By 1990, the NES had outsold all previously released consoles worldwide. The slogan for this brand was "It can't be beaten". The Nintendo Entertainment System was not available in the Soviet Union.

In the early 1990s, gamers predicted that competition from technologically superior systems such as the 16-bit Sega Genesis would mean the immediate end of the NES's dominance. Instead, during the first year of Nintendo's successor console the Super Famicom (named Super Nintendo Entertainment System outside Japan), the Famicom remained the second highest-selling video game console in Japan, outselling the newer and more powerful NEC PC Engine and Sega Mega Drive by a wide margin. The launch of the Genesis was overshadowed by the launch of Super Mario Bros. 3 for NES. The console remained popular in Japan and North America until late 1993, when the demand for new NES software abruptly plummeted. The final licensed Famicom game released in Japan is Takahashi Meijin no Bōken Jima IV (Adventure Island IV), in North America is Wario's Woods, and in Europe is The Lion King in 1995. In the wake of ever decreasing sales and the lack of new games, Nintendo of America officially discontinued the NES by 1995. Nintendo produced new Famicom units in Japan until September 25, 2003, and continued to repair Famicom consoles until October 31, 2007, attributing the discontinuation of support to insufficient supplies of parts.

The NES was initially not as successful in Europe during the late 1980s, when it was outsold by the Sega Master System in the United Kingdom. By 1990, the Master System was the highest-selling console in Europe, though the NES was beginning to have a fast-growing user base in the United Kingdom. During the early 1990s, NES sales caught up with and narrowly overtook the Master System overall in Western Europe, though the Master System maintained its lead in several markets such as the United Kingdom, Belgium and Spain.

Legacy 
The NES was released two years after the video game crash of 1983, when many retailers and adult consumers regarded electronic games as a passing fad, so many believed at first that the NES would soon fade. Before the NES and Famicom, Nintendo was known as a moderately successful Japanese toy and playing card manufacturer, but the consoles' popularity helped the company grow into an internationally recognized name almost synonymous with video games as Atari had been, and set the stage for Japanese dominance of the video game industry. With the NES, Nintendo also changed the relationship between console manufacturers and third-party software developers by restricting developers from publishing and distributing software without licensed approval. This led to higher-quality games, which helped change the attitude of a public that had grown weary from poorly produced games for earlier systems.

The NES hardware design is also very influential. Nintendo chose the name "Nintendo Entertainment System" for the US market and redesigned the system so it would not give the appearance of a child's toy. The front-loading cartridge input allowed it to be used more easily in a TV stand with other entertainment devices, such as a videocassette recorder.

The system's hardware limitations led to design principles that still influence the development of modern video games. Many prominent game franchises originated on the NES, including Nintendo's own Super Mario Bros.,| The Legend of Zelda and Metroid, Capcom's Mega Man franchise, Konami's Castlevania franchise, Square's Final Fantasy,| and Enix's Dragon Quest| franchises.

NES imagery, especially its controller, has become a popular motif for a variety of products, including Nintendo's Game Boy Advance. Clothing, accessories, and food items adorned with NES-themed imagery are still produced and sold in stores.

Emulation 

The NES can be emulated on many other systems. The first emulator was the Japanese-only Pasofami. It was soon followed by iNES, which is available in English and is cross-platform, in 1996. It was described as being the first NES emulation software that could be used by a non-expert. The first version of NESticle, an unofficial MS-DOS-based emulator, was released on April 3, 1997. Nintendo offers licensed emulation of some NES games via its Virtual Console service for the Wii, Nintendo 3DS, and Wii U, and via its Nintendo Switch Online service.

Re-release 

On July 14, 2016, Nintendo announced the November 2016 launch of a miniature replica of the NES, named the Nintendo Entertainment System: NES Classic Edition in the United States and Nintendo Classic Mini: Nintendo Entertainment System in Europe and Australia. The emulation-based console includes 30 permanently bundled games from the vintage NES library, including the Super Mario Bros. series and The Legend of Zelda series. The system has HDMI display output and a new replica controller, which can also connect to the Wii Remote for use with Virtual Console games. It was discontinued in North America on April 13, 2017, and worldwide on April 15, 2017. However, Nintendo announced in September 2017 that the NES Classic Mini would return to production on June 29, 2018, only to be discontinued again permanently by December of that year.

See also 
 History of Nintendo
 Nintendo hard
 Nintendo World Championships

Notes

Transliterations

References

Bibliography

External links 

 
 
 
 
 NES Classic Edition official website 

Nintendo Entertainment System
Home video game consoles
Third-generation video game consoles
1983 in video gaming
1980s in video gaming
1990s in video gaming
2000s in video gaming
1980s toys
1990s toys
2000s toys
Computer-related introductions in 1983
Products introduced in 1983
Products introduced in 1985
Products introduced in 1986
Products and services discontinued in 2003
1995 disestablishments in North America
2003 disestablishments in Japan
Discontinued video game consoles